Waimarino County is a former county of New Zealand. It was defined in 1910 by the Kaitieke County Act 1910 as follows:

Waimarino County was amalgamated with Raetihi Borough and Ohakune Borough to form Waimarino District in 1988.

See also 
 List of former territorial authorities in New Zealand § Counties

References

Counties of New Zealand